{{Infobox television station
| callsign = KING-TV
| city = Seattle, Washington
| logo = KING-TV Logo.svg
| logo_upright = .8
| branding = KING 5
| digital = 25 (UHF)
| virtual = 5
| translators = K13ER Cashmere/Leavenworth
| affiliations = {{ubl|5.1: NBC|for others, see }}
| owner = Tegna Inc.(sale to Standard General pending)| licensee = King Broadcasting Company
| location = Seattle–Tacoma, Washington
| country = United States
| airdate = 
| callsign_meaning = King Broadcasting Company
| sister_stations = KONG
| former_callsigns = KRSC-TV (1948–1949)
| former_channel_numbers = 
| former_affiliations = 
| erp = 715 kW
| haat = 
| facility_id = 34847
| coordinates = 
| licensing_authority = FCC
| website = 
}}

KING-TV (channel 5) is a television station in Seattle, Washington, United States, affiliated with NBC. It is owned by Tegna Inc. alongside Everett-licensed independent station KONG (channel 16). Both stations share studios at the Home Plate Center in the SoDo district of Seattle, while KING-TV's transmitter is located in the city's Queen Anne neighborhood.

Debuting as the first television station in the Pacific Northwest, channel 5 was purchased by and became the flagship station of Dorothy Bullitt's King Broadcasting Company eight months into broadcasting; the company still exists as a license holder for its properties under Tegna ownership. The station became an NBC affiliate in 1959 and has generally led the Seattle television market since.

History
Channel 5 first took to the air as KRSC-TV on November 25, 1948, becoming the first television station in the Pacific Northwest. The station was originally owned by Palmer K. Leberman's Radio Sales Corporation, which also operated KRSC radio (1150 AM, now KKNW, and FM 98.1, now KING-FM); the original callsign was derived from Leberman's company. The first broadcast on channel 5 was a live remote of a Thanksgiving Day high school football game – the telecast was plagued with technical difficulties, but local viewers reported being impressed nonetheless. Channel 5 was originally a primary CBS affiliate, and carried secondary affiliations with NBC, ABC and DuMont.

Eight months after the television station debuted, KRSC-TV and KRSC-FM were purchased by King Broadcasting Company, owners of KING radio (1090 AM, now KPTR) and the original KING-FM (94.9, frequency now occupied by KUOW-FM), for $375,000 in May 1949. The station changed its callsign to KING-TV to match its radio sisters (according to legend, King Broadcasting president Dorothy Bullitt purchased the KING call letters while on a fishing boat). For many years, the stations' logo was "King Mike", an anthropomorphized microphone in ermine robes and a crown, drawn by cartoonist Walt Disney (its sister stations in Portland, Oregon, KGW-AM-FM-TV, used a similar logo, called "Pioneer Mike"; the King Mike logo was later brought back for KING's 50th anniversary in 1998 and still appears in promotional announcements to this day).

Once the Federal Communications Commission (FCC)-imposed freeze on television station license awards ended in 1952, KING-TV lost its monopoly in the market. During 1953, the Seattle–Tacoma area received three new stations: KTNT-TV (channel 11, now KSTW) debuted in March as the market's CBS outlet; while NBC went to KMO-TV (channel 13, now KCPQ), which signed on in August. NBC moved a few months later to KOMO-TV (channel 4), which went on the air in December. By the end of the year, KING-TV was left with poor-performing ABC and DuMont, the latter of which ceased operations in 1956. Subsequently, Bullitt lobbied NBC for a group affiliation for her stations, and in October 1958, KING-TV and KGW-TV in Portland began carrying NBC programming. In Seattle, channel 5 shared NBC and ABC with KOMO-TV for most of the 1958–59 television season. On September 27, 1959, KING-TV became an exclusive NBC station and KOMO-TV affiliated with ABC full-time. KING-TV is one of a few handful of stations in the country to have held a primary affiliation with all of the "Big Three" networks."KOMO-TV joins ABC." Broadcasting, April 13, 1959, pg. 99.

Dissatisfied with Stimson Bullitt's management style, Dorothy Bullitt, and Mr. Bullitt's sisters, arranged for his voluntary resignation from King Broadcasting in 1972. Stimson sold his company shares to his sisters, Harriet and Patsy. He then received control of the family's real estate interests. Ancil Payne, who had served as general manager of the company's Portland stations since 1965, became president and CEO. By the 1970s and 1980s, KING-TV was the flagship of a growing regional media empire which at various times included ventures in publishing, the film industry, cable television systems (under the name of King Videocable, the assets of which have by now been absorbed into Comcast) and even various timber assets in the Far East.

Locally produced programs that debuted on the station during the 1970s and 1980s included Seattle Today/Good Company, a mid-morning talk show hosted by Cliff Lenz and Shirley Hudson and later by Susan Michaels and Colby Chester; Seattle Tonight, Tonite!, hosted by Ross McGowan and later Dick Klinger; Almost Live!, originally a Sunday night talk and comedy show hosted by Ross Shafer, that later became an ensemble sketch comedy show (that eventually moved to Saturday nights) after Shafer left to become host of The Late Show on Fox; and a local Evening Magazine franchise, first hosted by Penny LeGate and Brian Tracey. Of these, only Evening Magazine (now entitled simply Evening) exists today. How Come?, a half-hour early Sunday evening family television program hosted by Al Wallace, won several awards during its run during the 1970s and early 1980s. The show covered topics on how things were made or done in the world. Dick Klinger hosted the show after Al Wallace died.

King Broadcasting's stations included KGW radio and television in Portland, KREM-TV in Spokane, KTVB-TV in Boise, KHNL-TV and KFVE in Honolulu and KYA radio in San Francisco. Long-time station-owner Dorothy Bullitt died in June 1989. Dorothy Bullitt's daughters Harriet Bullitt and Priscilla "Patsy" Bullitt Collins decided to sell the King assets in 1992—eventually selling King Broadcasting (including KING, KREM, KGW, KTVB, KHNL/KFVE and the cable provider assets) to The Providence Journal Company. KING-TV and other King Broadcasting stations later became Belo properties as a result of that company's merger with The Providence Journal Company in 1997. As a result, Belo was forced to divest KIRO-TV to Cox Enterprises in order to keep the higher rated KING-TV.

Bonneville International Corporation purchased KING (AM) in 1994. During the 1990s, Almost Live!, as it became a pure comedy show, launched the careers of Bill Nye the Science Guy, Joel McHale (of The Soup fame) nationally and locally, Pat Cashman and John Keister (who replaced Ross Shafer as host of that show in 1988). KING-TV was also the home for Watch This!, a fast-paced Emmy Award-winning show aimed at children and teenagers; the show lasted five years and was hosted by local anchors, Jim Dever and Mimi Gan. On December 18, 1995, King Broadcasting launched Northwest Cable News (NWCN), which was a 24-hour regional cable news channel available primarily to cable providers in Washington, Oregon, and Idaho with lesser cable coverage in Alaska, Montana and California. Almost Live! ended after 15 years in 1999.

 Gannett/Tegna, move to SoDo 

On June 13, 2013, the Gannett Company announced that it would acquire Belo. The sale was completed on December 23. On June 29, 2015, Gannett's newspaper business was spun out, with KING-TV and Gannett's former TV properties renamed Tegna.

In April 2014, KING-TV announced plans to sell its South Lake Union headquarters and re-locate, taking advantage of a booming real estate market in the South Union Lake area. In September 2014, it was reported that the station was planning to lease multiple floors at the Home Plate Center, a complex in the SoDo area of Seattle, and located across the street from T-Mobile Park (formerly Safeco Field). In March 2015, Gannett confirmed that KING, KONG, and NWCN would move to the lower three floors of the Home Plate Center, and announced plans for KING-TV to utilize the lower floor for the market's first street-side studio. The former facilities were sold to Kilroy Realty for nearly $50 million, and were demolished during the summer of 2016, and would be replaced by mixed-use developments.

The choice of a smaller location was in response to concerns that the large size of its previous facility inhibited collaboration. The ground floor contains two studios: a street-side studio for KING-TV's news programming, and the other for local productions such as New Day Northwest. The newsroom is located on the second floor, and contained NWCN's main set. The new facility was equipped with new Grass Valley master control, graphics, and playout hardware, and Sony automation equipment. After broadcasting its final newscast from the North Dexter Avenue studio on February 12, 2016, KING quietly transitioned its master control to Home Plate Center during that night's broadcast of Late Night with Seth Meyers, and began broadcasting newscasts from the new facility the following morning.

On January 6, 2017, NWCN was shut down due to declining viewership, the free online streaming of KING and KONG's newscasts, and the reluctance of local cable systems to pay more for the channel to keep it operating.

Programming
As of September 2022, KING-TV broadcasts only three syndicated programs during its weekday schedule, Dr. Phil, Extra and Inside Edition. This, as part of the station relying less on syndicated programming and more on the station's newscasts and local programming, makes KING-TV one of several stations in the U.S. to share a similar strategy. Despite this, KING-TV was airing 3½ hours of syndicated programming prior to September 2013.

On New Year's Eve, KING-TV broadcasts coverage of the fireworks show on the Space Needle.

Sports programming
KING-TV opted not to carry NBC's telecasts of the Stanley Cup Finals in 2006, 2007, 2008 and 2013, when the games began at 5 p.m. Pacific time, choosing to instead air its regular lineup of local newscasts and syndicated shows. KONG picked up the NBC telecasts of the games, and CBC Television's broadcasts of the games were available to most cable providers in the region through the network's Vancouver owned-and-operated station CBUT. For the 2007 and 2008 Stanley Cup Finals, however, KING-TV aired NBC's Saturday night telecasts, while KONG aired the other NBC telecasts. As for the 2009 Stanley Cup Finals, KING-TV aired games 1, 2 and 5 while KONG aired games 6 and 7.

KING-TV has been the official television partner of the Seattle Seahawks since 2022, airing preseason games and team-focused shows; previous stints with the team were held from 1981 to 2000 and again from 2004 to 2011 (sister station KONG carried Seahawks preseason games in 2003 and 2004). The station also airs Seahawks games through NBC's broadcast contract with the NFL (via Sunday Night Football; it has also served as the team's unofficial home station, carrying most games from 1977 to 1997 when the team played in the AFC, which NBC held the broadcast rights to in those years). Notably, this included the team’s appearance in Super Bowl XLIX. Both KING-TV and KONG served as official television broadcasters of the city's Major League Soccer club Seattle Sounders FC from 2009 to 2013, in which KONG aired a weekly magazine program on Sunday nights during the season called Sounders FC Weekly, and was rebroadcast Mondays on sister cable channel Northwest Cable News.

KING-TV also broadcast all Seattle SuperSonics games covered through NBC's NBA broadcast contract from 1990 to 2002, including the team's 1996 NBA Finals appearance. It also aired select Seattle Mariners games via NBC's MLB broadcast contract from 1977 to 1989, and for the postseason only from 1995 to 2000.

News operation

KING-TV presently broadcasts 46 hours of locally produced newscasts each week (with seven hours each weekday, six hours on Saturdays and five hours on Sundays).

In 1999, to compete against KOMO-TV, KING-TV began broadcasting its newscasts in high definition; at the time it only had one studio camera that was HD-capable. In April 2007, KING-TV upgraded all of its studio cameras, graphics and weather system to high definition, and began broadcasting its public affairs programming in the format as well. Field reports continue to be broadcast in standard definition (480i converted to 1080i HD for telecast) but are taped in a 16:9 aspect ratio, giving the appearance of high-definition. According to KING-TV, it is "Seattle's First HD Newscast".

Following its sale to the company, KING-TV adopted Gannett's standardized newscast presentation (which used a color coding system modeled upon co-owned newspaper USA Today.

Notable former on-air staff
 Dennis Bounds – weekday morning anchor, later weeknight evening anchor (1991–2016, now retired)
 Aaron Brown  – evening co-anchor (was at KIRO-TV, ABC News, and CNN; now anchoring at PBS and teaching at Walter Cronkite School of Journalism)
 Jim Compton – host of The Compton Report (1985–1999)
 Lou Dobbs – anchor (was at CNN; formerly at Fox Business)
 Jean Enersen – Seattle's first female news anchor (1972–2016, now retired)
 Joe Fryer – general assignment/special projects reporter (2010–2013) (Now with NBC News as a Los Angeles-based correspondent)
 Grant Goodeve – Northwest Backroads host
 Jack Hamann – reporter
 David Kerley (was at KIRO-TV; currently at ABC News)
 Margaret Larson – reporter/late-night anchor, New Day Northwest host (formerly with NBC News, KIRO-TV; 1999–2002, 2010–2020, now retired)
 Lori Matsukawa – weeknight anchor (1983–2019); now retired
 Tonya Mosley – anchor/reporter (now co-host of NPR's Here and Now)
 Mark Mullen – morning/noon co-anchor (formerly with WNBC-TV and ABC News; currently at KNSD in San Diego)
 Shannon O'Donnell – weather anchor (1996–2000 and 2007–2009; now weather anchor at KOMO-TV)
 Greg Palmer – reporter
 Don Poier (later radio voice of Vancouver/Memphis Grizzlies, deceased)
 Wendy Tokuda - reporter/anchor (1974-1977); later worked in San Francisco and Los Angeles, now retired

 Technical information 
 Subchannels 
The station's digital signal is multiplexed:

On December 6, 2011, Belo signed an agreement with the Live Well Network to affiliate with digital subchannels of KING-TV and Spokane sister station KSKN; Live Well Network replaced Universal Sports on digital subchannel 5.2 on January 1, 2012, as Universal Sports transitioned into a cable and satellite channel during the first quarter of 2012. Justice Network replaced Live Well Network on 5.2 in January 2015.

Analog-to-digital conversion
KING-TV ceased regular programming over its analog signal, on June 12, 2009, as part of the federally mandated transition from analog to digital television. As the "analog nightlight" station for the Seattle–Tacoma market, it aired a loop reminding viewers to get a digital converter box on analog channel 5 until June 26, 2009. The station's digital signal remained on its pre-transition UHF channel 48,List of Digital Full-Power Stations  using PSIP to display KING-TV's virtual channel as 5 on digital television receivers.

Canadian and out-of-market coverage
KING-TV is one of five Seattle television stations that are available in Canada on satellite providers Bell Satellite TV and Shaw Direct, and is available to most cable subscribers in the Vancouver/Victoria, British Columbia area as the NBC affiliate. The station is also carried on several cable providers in southeastern Alaska and northwestern Oregon, as well as in the Yakima DMA cities of Cle Elum and Ellensburg, with NBC programming and some syndicated shows blacked out due to FCC regulations. KING-TV is also carried in The Bahamas on REV TV.

References
Specific citations:

General references:Dorothy Stimson Bullitt: An Uncommon Life by Delphine Haley, from Sasquatch Press; King: The Bullitts of Seattle and Their Communications Empire by O. Casey Corr, from University of Washington Press; On the Air: The King Broadcasting Story'' by Daniel Jack Chasan, from Island Publishers;

External links

Essay on Dorothy Bullitt from HistoryLink

ING-TV
NBC network affiliates
True Crime Network affiliates
Quest (American TV network) affiliates
Twist (TV network) affiliates
Tegna Inc.
Television channels and stations established in 1948
1948 establishments in Washington (state)
Peabody Award winners
Former Gannett subsidiaries